Kampung Bukit Treh is a small village in Muar District, Johor, Malaysia. 

Towns, suburbs and villages in Muar